Eocypselus rowei is an extinct bird believed to be ancestral to modern hummingbirds and swifts. The bird was first described in 2013 and lived approximately 50 million years ago, during the Eocene epoch.

Discovery and classification
Eocypselus rowei was first described in 2013 by Daniel T. Ksepka, Julia A. Clarke, Sterling J. Nesbitt, Felicia B. Kulp, and Lance Grande in the Proceedings of the Royal Society B: Biological Sciences.  The researchers spotted an exceptionally preserved specimen, originally harvested from the Green River Formation of Wyoming, while working at Chicago's Field Museum of Natural History.  The specimen includes well preserved feathers and a nearly complete skeleton.  It contains fossilized melanosomes, pigmentation cell structures.  They named the new species in honor of John Rowe, Chairman of the Field Museum's Board of Trustees. The discoverers chose to honor Rowe, whom they considered to be a "fossil geek."

According to its discoverers, E. rowei is a basal form of the order Apodiformes, which traditionally includes hummingbirds, tree swifts, and swifts. Earlier authors reached the same conclusions based on European fossils of Eocypselus.

Description
Eocypselus rowei shares features in common with both hummingbirds and swifts leading Ksepka to declare "This fossil bird represents the closest we've gotten to the point where swifts and hummingbirds went their separate ways". It was probably not a hoverer, like a hummingbird, but also not a fast flyer like a swift. Its feathers made up more than half the size of its wingspan. It probably had black plumage and may have had an iridescent sheen, like modern swifts.

Eocypselus rowei lived approximately 50 million years ago, during the Eocene epoch.  It was probably an insectivore.

References

Apodiformes
Eocene birds
Extinct birds of North America
Extinct animals of the United States
Fossil taxa described in 2013
Paleogene birds of North America
Taxa named by Sterling Nesbitt